Abdelaziz Abbès (born 7 October 1963) is an Algerian football manager. Since 2012, he has worked in teams like CA Bordj Bou Arréridj, CRB Aïn Fakroun, CA Batna, MC El Eulma, USM El Harrach, NC Magra and WA Tlemcen.

References

External links
 

1963 births
Living people
Algerian football managers
CA Bordj Bou Arréridj managers
CRB Aïn Fakroun managers
CA Batna managers
MC El Eulma managers
USM El Harrach managers
NC Magra managers
WA Tlemcen managers
Algerian Ligue Professionnelle 1 managers
21st-century Algerian people